Love Stories & Other Musings is the fifth studio album by the alternative rock band Candlebox. It was released in 2012 on Audionest.

Reception
Stephen Thomas Erlewine of AllMusic thought the album to be Candlebox's best and richest album, and that this is due to a combination of "the melodicism of post-grunge and bear the lightness and nimble chops that come with middle age."

The album debuted at No. 82 on the Billboard 200, and No. 25 on Top Rock Albums. with around 5,000 copies sold in its first week. The album has sold 21,000 copies as of April 2016.

Track listing

Tracks 10–14 are rerecordings of band's previous hits.

Personnel

Candlebox
Kevin Martin – lead vocals
Peter Klett – lead guitar
Sean Hennesy – rhythm guitar
Adam Kury – bass
Scott Mercado – drums

Additional musicians
Dave Krusen – drums
Walker Gibson – keyboards

Charts

References

2012 albums
Candlebox albums